Robert Mosley Master (b Croston 12 February 1794 – d Poulton-le-Fylde 1 July 1867), also known as the “Clogging Parson”, was  Archdeacon of Manchester, England. from 1854 to 1867.

He was educated at Balliol College, Oxford and ordained in 1822. After a curacy in Burnley he was the incumbent at Leyland, Lancashire until his last appointment at Croston.

His father in law was  Member of Parliament for Midhurst.

References

Alumni of Balliol College, Oxford
Archdeacons of Manchester
1794 births
1867 deaths